I've Got a Tiger by the Tail is an album by Buck Owens and his Buckaroos, released in 1965. It reached Number one on the Billboard Country charts and Number 43 on the Pop Albums charts.

It was re-released on CD in 1995 by Sundazed Records with two bonus tracks, both live performances recorded in Bakersfield, CA at the Civic Auditorium in October 1963. The album was included in Robert Dimery's 1001 Albums You Must Hear Before You Die.

Style
The album was an example of Bakersfield sound, country music developed in the mid to late 1950s around Bakersfield, California, and influenced both by rock and what was called hillbilly music.  The album featured the distinctive sound of Don Rich playing the telecaster.

Reception

In his Allmusic review, critic Cub Koda called the album "Owens' Bakersfield honky tonk sound at the height of its freight-train rumbling powers."  The album was Billboard's first #1 country album of the year, in 1965.

Track listing
Side one
 "I've Got a Tiger By the Tail" (Harlan Howard, Buck Owens) – 2:12
 "Trouble and Me" (Howard) – 1:54
 "Let the Sad Times Roll On" (Owens, Red Simpson) – 2:14
 "Wham Bam" (Buck Owens, Bonnie Owens, Don Rich) – 2:01
 "If You Fall Out of Love With Me" (Owens, Owens) – 2:15
 "Fallin' for You" (Owens, Owens, Rich) – 2:01
Side two
"We're Gonna Let the Good Times Roll" (Owens) – 2:15
 "The Band Keeps Playin' On" (Red Simpson, Fuzzy Owen) – 3:02
 "Streets of Laredo" – 2:55
 "Cryin' Time" (Owens) – 2:30
 "A Maiden's Prayer" (Bob Wills) – 2:33
 "Memphis" (Chuck Berry) – 2:27

1995 bonus tracks
"This Ol' Heart" (Eddie Miller, Bob Morris) – 1:12
 "Act Naturally" (Johnny Russell, Voni Morrison) – 2:28

Personnel
Buck Owens – guitar, vocals
Don Rich – guitar, fiddle, vocals (lead vocal on "Wham Bam")
Doyle Holly – bass, guitar, vocals (lead vocal on "Streets of Laredo")
Tom Brumley – pedal steel guitar, guitar
Willie Cantu – drums
Mel King – drums
Bob Morris – bass, vocals
Jay McDonald – pedal steel guitar
Jelly Sanders – fiddle, guitar

References

1965 albums
Buck Owens albums
Capitol Records albums
Albums produced by Ken Nelson (United States record producer)

Albums recorded at Capitol Studios